Héritage des Celtes is a folk-rock album by Dan Ar Braz and Héritage des Celtes musicians, released in 1994 by Columbia France (Sony Music distribution), catalogue number COL 477763 2.

The album was produced by ex-Bothy Band and Moving Hearts leader Dónal Lunny. It was recorded at Windmill Lane Studios, Dublin by Brian Masterson and Alastair McMillan, and mixed by Brian Masterson and Rob Kirwan. The singers are Elaine Morgan from Rose Among Thorns and Karen Matheson of Capercaillie fame.

A live version of this material as played by Ar Braz and a large ensemble (recorded in Rennes the following year) appears on the album Et les 50 musiciens de l'Héritage des Celtes, En concert.

Track listing 
"Borders of Salt" (Traditional; arranged by Ar Braz)
"Spike Island Lasses" (Traditional; arranged by Nollaig Casey and Dónal Lunny)
"Language of the Gaels" (Murdo Macfarlane)
"Green Lands" (Ar Braz)
"Maro Eo Ma Mestrez" (Traditional; arranged by Ar Braz)
"April The 3rd" (Dónal Lunny)
"Eliziza" (Traditional; arranged by Ar Braz)
"King of Laois" (Traditional; arranged by Ar Braz)
"The Island" (Paul Brady)
"Scottish Suite" (Ar Braz)
"Me Zo Ganet E Kreiz Ar Mor" (Yann Ber Calloc'h, Jef Le Penven)
"Call to The Dance" (Ar Braz)

Personnel 
Dan Ar Braz
Dónal Lunny - bouzouki, vocals, bodhran
Noel Bridgeman - percussion
Ronan Browne - uilleann pipes, flute, low whistle, tin whistle
Nollaig Casey - violin
Ray Fean - drums
Jean-Louis Henaff - bombard
Olivier Lecuyer - bombard
Patrig Molard - bagpipes
Eoghan O'Neill - bass
Jacques Pellen - acoustic guitar
Erwan Ropars - bagpipes
Donald Shaw - keyboards, vocals
Jean-Michel Veillon - flute
Karen Matheson - vocals
Elaine Morgan - vocals
Yann Fanch Kemener - vocals
Gilles Servat - vocals

with
Bagad Kemper (pipe band)
Shotts Pipe Band

References

1994 albums
Dan Ar Braz albums
Héritage des Celtes albums